Opilioacarus texanus is a species of mite in the family Opilioacaridae.

References

Parasitiformes
Articles created by Qbugbot
Animals described in 1942